"Fooled by a Smile" is a 1987 song by the British pop act Swing Out Sister. It was the final single to be taken from their debut album It's Better To Travel and reached #43 on the UK Singles Chart in July of that year.

It would be the final single that drummer Martin Jackson would appear on in the writing credits and in the music video. Consequently, Swing Out Sister became a duo after this single.

Music video
The music video for this single features Corinne Drewery, Andy Connell and Jackson riding bicycles and enjoying other leisure activities around the Salton Sea area in Southern California. Visible in the video are the famous "Texaco Marine" sign and the North Shore Beach and Yacht Club.

As with "Twilight World," "Fooled by a Smile" would include segments shot in Super-8.

Remixes

"Fooled by a Smile" (7" Remix/TV Mix)  (As featured on the UK - Best Of - CD Album Breakout and the 7" Single) 
"Fooled by a Smile" (Album Version)  (Taken from the Album It's Better To Travel) 
"Fooled by a Smile" (Ralph Mix)  (As featured on the Japanese CD Album Another Non-Stop Sister and the UK 12" Single) 
"Fooled by a Smile" (Phi Phi Mix)  (As featured on the Japanese CD Album Swing 3, the VERY 'Limited Edition' Japanese CD Remixes and Others from the "Splendid Collection" and the Japanese 7" Single)

References

1987 singles
Swing Out Sister songs
Songs written by Martin Jackson
Songs written by Andy Connell
Songs written by Corinne Drewery
1987 songs
Mercury Records singles